Meyrickiella is a monotypic snout moth genus described by George Hampson in 1901. Its single species, Meyrickiella homosema, was described by Edward Meyrick in 1887. It is found in Australia.

References

Moths described in 1887
Phycitini
Monotypic moth genera
Moths of Australia
Pyralidae genera
Taxa named by George Hampson